The Stonebraker and Harbaugh–Shafer Building in Middletown, Maryland was built circa 1830 with a residential section to the east and a commercial section to the west. The Federal style building incorporates Greek Revival detailing in the interior.

The Stonebraker and Harbaugh–Shafer Building was listed on the National Register of Historic Places in 2002. It is included in the Middletown Historic District.

References

External links

, including photo in 2001, at Maryland Historical Trust

Houses on the National Register of Historic Places in Maryland
Federal architecture in Maryland
Houses in Frederick County, Maryland
Houses completed in 1830
1830 establishments in Maryland
National Register of Historic Places in Frederick County, Maryland
Historic district contributing properties in Maryland